Ibán Pérez Manzanares (born November 13, 1983, in Barcelona) is a volleyball player from Spain men's national volleyball team. Pérez represented Spain at the 2007 European Championship in Moscow, Russia. He was honored as the best scorer at the 2010 FIVB Men's World Championship.

Individual awards
 2010 FIVB Volleyball World Championship "Best Scorer"

References
 Ibán Pérez Manzanares at the International Volleyball Federation

External links
 
 Iban Perez at Lega Pallavolo Serie A 

1983 births
Living people
Spanish men's volleyball players
Sportspeople from Barcelona
Mediterranean Games medalists in volleyball
Mediterranean Games silver medalists for Spain
Competitors at the 2009 Mediterranean Games